Indolence means lack of activity and may refer to:
 Laziness of people and living beings
 A sign of benignity in histopathology of tumors

See also
 Indolent (disambiguation)